Richard E. Council (born October 1, 1947 in Tampa, Florida), sometimes credited as Richard Council, is an American film, television and stage actor.

Career 
His Broadway credits include Conversations with My Father and I'm Not Rappaport, both plays by Herb Gardner; The Royal Family, The Merchant of Venice and The Philadelphia Story, all plays directed by Ellis Rabb. At the Lincoln Center Theater he performed opposite Stockard Channing in The Little Foxes directed by Jack O'Brien. Off-Broadway he appeared in Nine Armenians by Leslie Ayvazian at the Manhattan Theatre Club, Isn't It Romantic by Wendy Wasserstein at the Lucille Lortel Theatre and Isadora Duncan Sleeps with The Russian Navy by Jeff Wanshel at the American Place Theatre. He played Michael Blake on CBS Television's Love of Life from 1976–1978.
Notable feature film appearances include Die Hard with a Vengeance, Canadian Bacon, Witness to the Mob, I'm Not Rappaport, and Thirteen Conversations About One Thing.

Filmography

Film

Television

References

External links
 

Living people
1947 births
American male actors